James Charlton (born 1947) is an Australian poet and writer in the area of interfaith and interreligious studies. Born in Melbourne, Australia, Charlton has lived mostly in Tasmania. He completed an MA at the University of Cambridge, where he was at Fitzwilliam College, and a PhD at the University of Tasmania. Poetry editor of the Australian literary quarterly Island from 2002 to 2008, he delivered the inaugural Gwen Harwood Memorial Lecture in 2008.

Works
Charlton's Luminous Bodies was published in 2001 by Montpelier Press and tied for second place for the 2002 Anne Elder Award. So Much Light was published in 2007 by Pardalote Press.

Numerous poems of his have been published in anthologies, in literary journals (Australian, American and British) and in newspapers. Various poems have been broadcast. "Transgressive Saints", shortlisted for the 2006 Broadway Poetry Prize, was published in The Broadway Poetry Prize Winners 2006 by Picaro Press.

"Letter to Walt Whitman re: Iraq" was published in The Best Australian Poems 2006 by Black Inc.

Charlton's study of three European mystical poet-theologians, Non-dualism in Eckhart, Julian of Norwich and Traherne: A Theopoetic Reflection, was published by Bloomsbury in January 2013.

Reviews of Charlton's work
 Luminous Bodies review by Christopher Bantick, Sunday Tasmanian, 17 Feb 2002.
 Luminous Bodies review by Mark O'Connor, Canberra Times, 2 March 2002.
 Luminous Bodies review by Anne Kellas, Famous Reporter, #25, June 2002.
 Luminous Bodies review by Philip Harvey, Eureka Street, July–August 2002.
 Luminous Bodies review by Eleonora Court, 40 Degrees South, #25.
 Luminous Bodies review by Kris Hemensley, Island, #89 Autumn 2002.
 Luminous Bodies review by Judith Beveridge, The Write Stuff, vol 7.
 Luminous Bodies review by Anuraag Sharma, The Write Stuff, vol 7.
 Luminous Bodies review by Geoff Page, Australian Book Review, May 2002.
 Luminous Bodies review by Sheelagh Wegman, Tasmanian Anglican, April 2002.
 So Much Light review by Christopher Bantick, Sunday Tasmanian, 14 Oct 2007.
 So Much Light review by Margaret Bradstock, Five Bells, 15:1 Summer 2007-08.
 So Much Light review by Sheelagh Wegman, Tasmanian Anglican, April 2008.
 So Much Light review by David Kelly, Famous Reporter, #40, 2009.
 So Much Light review by Kerry Leves, Overland, #194, 2009.

References

External links
"Isle of poets session at Tasmanian Living Writers' Week" from ABC Online
Links to some reviews of So Much Light
Poems by Charlton

Australian poets
1947 births
Living people
Writers from Melbourne
Alumni of Fitzwilliam College, Cambridge
University of Tasmania alumni